Matthew Joel Rabin (born December 27, 1963) is the Pershing Square Professor of Behavioral Economics in the Harvard Economics Department and Harvard Business School. Rabin's research focuses primarily on incorporating psychologically more realistic assumptions into empirically applicable formal economic theory. His topics of interest include errors in statistical reasoning and the evolution of beliefs, effects of choice context on exhibited preferences, reference-dependent preferences, and errors people make in inference in market and learning settings.

Background
Rabin was the Edward G. and Nancy S. Jordan Professor of Economics at the University of California, Berkeley Economics Department for 25 years before moving to Harvard. He received a Bachelor of Arts in Economics and Mathematics from University of Wisconsin–Madison in 1984 and PhD in Economics from MIT in 1989. Before entering MIT, he was a research student at the London School of Economics. He is a member of the Russell Sage Foundation Behavioral Economics Roundtable and co-organizer of the Russell Sage Summer Institute in Behavioral Economics. Rabin has also been a visiting professor at M.I.T., London School of Economics, Northwestern, Harvard, and Caltech, and a visiting scholar at the Center for Advanced Study in Behavioral Sciences at Stanford, and the Russell Sage Foundation.

His research is  directed, among other economic fields, towards behavioral finance and behavioral economics. Rabin works on the economics of individual self-control problems, reference-dependent preferences, fairness motives and mistakes in probabilistic reasoning. He developed Rabin fairness as a model to account for fairness in social preferences. In 2001 he was awarded the John Bates Clark Medal by the American Economic Association and also the MacArthur "Genius" Fellowship. In 2006 he was awarded the John von Neumann Award by the Rajk László College for Advanced Studies.

References

External links
Psychology and Economics An essay by Matthew Rabin
In Honor of Matthew Rabin: Winner of the John Bates Clark Medal

1963 births
Living people
MacArthur Fellows
Behavioral economists
Fellows of the Econometric Society
University of Wisconsin–Madison College of Letters and Science alumni
MIT School of Humanities, Arts, and Social Sciences alumni
University of California, Berkeley faculty
Harvard Business School faculty
20th-century American economists
21st-century American economists